The 1991 All-SEC football team consists of American football players selected to the All-Southeastern Conference (SEC) chosen by various selectors for the 1991 college football season.

The Florida Gators won the conference, posting an undefeated conference record. Florida quarterback Shane Matthews repeated as SEC Player of the Year.

Offensive selections

Quarterbacks 

 Shane Matthews, Florida (AP-1, Coaches-1)

Running backs 

 Corey Harris, Vanderbilt (AP-1, Coaches-1)
 Errict Rhett, Florida (AP-1)
Siran Stacy, Alabama (Coaches-1)

Wide receivers 
Carl Pickens, Tennessee (AP-1, Coaches-1)
Todd Kinchen, LSU (AP-1, Coaches-1)

Centers 
Cal Dixon, Florida (AP-1, Coaches-1)

Guards 
Tom Myslinski, Tennessee (AP-1, Coaches-1)
Hesham Ismail, Florida (AP-1, Coaches-1)

Tackles
John James, Miss. St. (AP-1, Coaches-1)
Kevin Mawae, LSU (AP-1, Coaches-1)
Eddie Blake, Auburn (Coaches-1)

Tight ends 
 Tyji Armstrong, Ole Miss (AP-1)
 Victor Hall, Auburn (Coaches-1)

Defensive selections

Ends
Chuck Smith, Tennessee (AP-1)
Chris Mims, Tennessee (AP-1)
Nate Williams, Miss. St. (Coaches-1)

Tackles 
Brad Culpepper, Florida (AP-1, Coaches-1)
Tony McCoy, Florida (AP-1)

Middle guards
Robert Stewart, Alabama (AP-1, Coaches-1)

Linebackers 
Dwayne Simmons, Georgia (AP-1, Coaches-1)
Tim Paulk, Florida (AP-1, Coaches-1)
John Sullins, Alabama (AP-1)
Keo Coleman, Miss. St. (AP-1)
Ephesians Bartley, Florida (Coaches-1)
Darryl Hardy, Tennessee (Coaches-1)

Backs 
Dale Carter, Tennessee (AP-1, Coaches-1)
Will White, Florida (AP-1, Coaches-1)
Corey Barlow, Auburn (AP-1, Coaches-1)
Jeremy Lincoln, Tennessee (Coaches-1)

Special teams

Kicker 
Doug Pelfrey, Kentucky (AP-1)
Arden Czyzewski, Florida (Coaches-1)

Punter 

 Shayne Edge, Florida (AP-1, Coaches-1)

Key
AP = Associated Press

Coaches = selected by the SEC coaches

Bold = Consensus first-team selection by both AP and Coaches

See also
1991 College Football All-America Team

References

All-SEC
All-SEC football teams